Charalampos Dosas (born 11 December 1962) is a Greek former professional football player who played as a defender.

Club career
Dosas started his career from the now defunct amateur side Astir Neo Perivoli and he signed for 1982 Greek Cup runners-up AE Larissa in the summer of 1982 ​alongside also promising young players such as Georgios Mitsibonas and Sakis Tsiolis. They were all chosen by Polish coach Jacek Gmoch. Ntosas won the 1985 Greek Cup with AE Larissa, one of the strongest sides of Greek football in the 1980s. In 1986 he joined Toxotis Larissa in Delta Ethniki and later Ampelokipoi Larissa where he became the club's captain and one of its most iconic players.

References

1962 births
Greek footballers
Athlitiki Enosi Larissa F.C. players
Living people
Association football defenders
Footballers from Larissa